The Venerable John Lilly was Archdeacon of Hereford from 1823 to 1825.

Born in Worcester, he was educated at Merton College, Oxford. The Rector of Stoke Lacy, he died on 30 October 1825.

Notes

Clergy from Worcester, England
Alumni of Merton College, Oxford
Archdeacons of Hereford
1825 deaths
Year of birth missing